Get on Board is the debut studio album by Australian rock and pop band The Badloves. released in July 1993. The album peaked at number 3 on the ARIA Albums chart and was certified double platinum by ARIA. It was re-released in 1994 with a bonus 8-track disc.

At the ARIA Music Awards of 1994, Get on Board was nominated for the Album of the Year and won Best New Talent and Breakthrough Artist – Album. Furthermore, at the ARIA Music Awards of 1995, it was nominated for Highest Selling Album.

Background 

Australian rock and pop group, the Badloves' debut album Get on Board appeared in July 1993 via Mushroom Records, which the band co-produced with Doug Roberts. They had been formed in 1990 by John "Jak" Housden on lead guitar, Stephen "Irish" O'Prey on bass guitar, John Spiby on keyboards and saxophone, his brother Michael Spiby on lead vocals and guitar and Chris Tabone on drums. The album was preceded by the singles, "Lost" (March 1993) and "I Remember" (July) and was followed by "Green Limousine" (November) and "Memphis" (March 1994). The album peaked at number 3 on the ARIA Albums chart and was certified double platinum by ARIA.

At the ARIA Music Awards of 1994, Get on Board was nominated for the Album of the Year and won Best New Talent and Breakthrough Artist – Album. Furthermore, at the ARIA Music Awards of 1995, it was nominated for Highest Selling Album.

Track listing

Personnel 

Credits:

The Badloves
 John "Jak" Housden – lead guitar, backing vocals
 Stephen "Irish" O'Prey _ bass guitar, backing vocals
 John Spiby – keyboards, saxophone, tenor saxophone (tracks 6, 7) 
 Michael Spiby – lead vocals, lead guitar
 Chris Tabone – drums

Additional musicians
 Susie Ahern – backing vocals (tracks 1, 4, 6), vocals (track 2)
 Jen Anderson – violin, viola 
 Henric Beiers – cello (tracks 1, 4, 7)
 Tony Featherstone – piano, organ (1,4,7)
 Rob Tronca – electric piano (tracks 2, 3, 4)
 Kintsho Tshabalala – bell tree (tracks 2, 9), shaker (track 2)
 Paul Williamson – baritone saxophone (track 7)
 Chris Wilson – harmonica (tracks 8,9), vocals (track 8)
 David Wilson – backing vocals (tracks 1, 4, 6)

Artisans
 Doug Roberts – producer, recording engineer, mixer
 Kate Hopkins  B&W photography
 Debbie Lord – design
 Letitia O'Prey  B&W photography
 Greg O'Shea – assistant recording engineer, assistant mixer
 Ilana Rose – photography
 Leon Zervos – mastering engineer

Charts

Weekly charts

Year-end charts

Certification

Release history

References

1993 debut albums
The Badloves albums
Mushroom Records albums
ARIA Award-winning albums